Strive is a 2019 American independent coming-of-age drama film.  Set in Harlem, the film tells the story of Kalani Johnson (JoiStaRR), a driven 18-year-old high school student who dreams of getting accepted into Yale University while facing the challenging life in the projects and streets of Harlem - with her only ally being college counselor Mr. Rose (Danny Glover).

The film premiered at the Harlem International Film Festival in May 2019. In June 2019, it screened in competition at the American Black Film Festival in Miami, and won the Jury Award for "Best Screenplay".

Cast
 JoiStaRR as Kalani Johnson
 Danny Glover as Mr. Rose
 Shaylin Becton as Bebe Johnson
 Ricky Flowers Jr. as Jacob Johnson
 Chelsea Lee Wiliams as Grace Johnson
 Warryn Campbell as The Pastor
 Tony D. Head as Mr. Stokes

Production 
Pre-production for the film began at Aletheia Films and Prodigium Pictures in early 2017. Writer Sha-Risse Smith set out to make an inspirational film: "I wish I had a film like this when I was going to boarding school. [...] I want people to watch this and say, if Kalani can do this I can too." Glover joined the film in pre-production as Mr. Rose, a pivotal character for the film.

Strive was shot on location in Harlem later that summer, hiring cast and crew that was mostly New York City-based. The events of the film loosely take place around the housing projects of the Polo Grounds Towers in Coogan's Bluff. The namesake for the film is Striver's Row. Filming took place in and around both of these locations. Residents and community leaders of Harlem were consulted to the choice of locations and depictions of characters.

Post-production happened in Los Angeles, with Company 3 providing the coloring of the film. Campbell composed the music for the film, while JoiStaRR sang the closing song of the film.

Reception

Accolades 
Strive received the Audience Award, while JoiStaRR received the Best Actress Award at the Harlem International Film Festival and the film screenplay was awarded the Jury Award at the American Black Film Festival in 2019. It was screened at the San Francisco Black Film Festival in June 2019, at the Black Harvest Film Festival in Chicago in August 2019, at the Greater Cleveland Urban Film Festival in Ohio as well as the opening film for The Valley Film Festival in Los Angeles in September.

References

External links 
 
 

2000s coming-of-age drama films
American drama films
Films about the education system in the United States
Films set in the 2000s
Films set in New York City
Films about domestic violence
2010s English-language films
2010s American films